The 2023 MPBL season is the ongoing fifth season of the Maharlika Pilipinas Basketball League (MPBL). The season began on March 11, 2023. This season features 29 teams, with five teams returning to league alongside two expansion teams.

The league will take two breaks during the regular season: during the Holy Week, and for the 2023 FIBA Basketball World Cup, which the Philippines is co-hosting.

The Nueva Ecija Rice Vanguards will enter the season as defending champions, after defeating the Zamboanga Family's Brand Sardines, three games to one, in the 2022 MPBL Finals. The two teams met in the 2023 Preseason Invitational finals, where Zamboanga beat Nueva Ecija, 88-80.

This season marks the second year of OKBet's sponsorship with the league.

Format
 Just like in previous seasons, all teams will play in a single round-robin regardless of division. This season, each team will play a total of 28 games.
 A series of games are played during gamedays, with the final game usually having the home team participating.
 If there are any games which were postponed during the regular season, the game/s shall be played especially if these games will have significant effects in the standings after they are played.
 If there are ties in the standings, these will be broken via the following criterion: 1) Head-to-head record, 2) Head-to-head point differential, 3) Point differential, 4) Points scored.

Transactions

Coaching changes

Team changes

Participation changes
All teams from the previous season returned to the league alongside five returning teams: the Bicol Volcanoes, Bulacan Kuyas, and Iloilo United Royals, all of which last competed in the 2021 Invitational, as well as the Parañaque Patriots and Pasay Voyagers, both of which last competed in the 2019–20 season. Although sources stated that the Cebu Casino Ethyl Alcohol would return this season as the Cebu Sharks, the team backed out before the season began.

This season also featured two expansion teams: the Negros Muscovados making its first regular season appearance after competing in the 2021 Invitational, and the Quezon Huskers making its first league appearance altogether. Thus, the total number of teams increased from 22 to 29 teams.

Team realignment 
The Rizal Golden Coolers were moved back to the Northern Division, where the team was during the 2019–20 season. This was team’s third consecutive realignment.

Name changes

 The Batangas City Embassy Chill changed its name to Batangas City Tanduay Rum Masters, but only for the 2023 Preseason Invitational.
 The Bacolod Bingo Plus changed its name to Bacolod Maskaras before the start of the season.
 The Bulacan Kuyas changed its name to Bulacan Kuyas - Baliwag City before the start of the season.
 The Caloocan Excellence changed its name to Batang Kankaloo - Koolers before the start of the season.
 The Imus City Bandera changed its name to Imus SV Squad before the start of the season.
 The Laguna Heroes Krah Asia changed its name to Laguna Krah Asia before the start of the season.
 The Makati x MNL Kingpin changed its name to Makati OKBet Kings before the start of the season.
 The Mindoro Tams changed its name to Oriental Mindoro Disiplinados before the start of the season.
 The Quezon City MG changed its name to Quezon City Gaz N Go before the start of the season.

Pre-season
The 2023 MPBL Preseason Invitational served as a pre-season pocket tournament for the 2023 MPBL season. The tournament was held at Lagao Gym in General Santos, home arena of the GenSan Warriors, from February 21–27 with a champions' purse of 3 million.

A total of eight teams competed in the tournament. These include seven MPBL teams, as well as Bulalakaw, a local team based in General Santos, and is the league’s first guest team.

Team groupings
The eight teams will be divided into two groups of four teams each. The seven participating MPBL teams are seeded by their winning percentage in the 2022 MPBL season, while guest team Bulalakaw is slotted in Group A.

Elimination round
The elimination round games were played from February 21–24. Teams play against the other teams within their group once, for a total of three elimination games. The top two teams per group would advance to the Semifinals; tiebreaker rules are used should there be any ties.

Group A

Group B

Playoffs
The playoffs were played on February 25 and 27. The top two teams from each group advanced to the playoffs, which used a single-elimination format. The top teams in each group played the second-placed teams in the other group.

The losing teams from both semifinal matches play in a third-place match, while the winning teams advance to the pre-season finals.

Bracket

Notable events 
 March 11, 2023 – James Castro became the 14th player to reach 1,000 MPBL career points. 
 March 20, 2023 – Chito Jaime became the 15th player to reach 1,000 MPBL career points in four seasons.

Opening ceremony 
The opening ceremony was held on March 11, 2023 at Quezon Convention Center in Lucena, Quezon. Rapper Andrew E. was one of the performers to kick off the regular season. Some teams also featured a muse to represent the team.

The first game was between the Rizal Golden Coolers and the Bataan Risers, while the first home game featured the two expansion teams this season, with the Quezon Huskers hosting the Negros Muscovados.

Regular season
29 teams are set to compete in the regular season.

Team standings

Northern Division

Southern Division

Results

Not all games are in home–away format. Each team plays every team once. Number of asterisks after each score denotes number of overtimes played.

Statistics

Individual statistical leaders

Media coverage 
For the second straight year, games are broadcast on One PH, One Sports+, and the MPBL's official Facebook page and YouTube channel, and iWantTFC for international streaming. New to this season, Media Pilipinas TV will also be broadcasting games.

References

Maharlika Pilipinas Basketball League
2023–24 in Philippine basketball leagues